{{Infobox animanga/Print
| type            = manga
| title           = Magical Girl Lyrical Nanoha ViVid Life
| author          = Masaki Tsuzuki
| illustrator     = Nekotōfu
| publisher       = Kadokawa Shoten
| demographic     = Seinen
| magazine        = Comptiq (2011-2013)Comp Ace (2013-2016)'
| first           = April 10, 2011
| last            = March 26, 2016
| volumes         = 4
| volume_list     = #Magical Girl Lyrical Nanoha ViVid Life
}}

 is a Japanese manga series written by Masaki Tsuzuki and illustrated by Takuya Fujima. It is part of Magical Girl Lyrical Nanoha franchise, taking place four years after the events of Magical Girl Lyrical Nanoha StrikerS. The series began serialization in Kadokawa Shoten's Comp Ace on May 26, 2009. An anime television series adaptation produced by A-1 Pictures aired in Japan from April 3 to June 19, 2015. A spin-off original anime project by Seven Arcs Pictures, titled ViVid Strike!, aired between October and December 2016, featuring a new pair of protagonists.

Plot

The series takes place four years after the events of Magical Girl Lyrical Nanoha StrikerS, during which magical girl Nanoha Takamachi rescued and adopted a young girl named Vivio, who is the clone of the Sankt Kaiser, Olivie Segbrecht. After entering her fourth year of elementary school, Vivio is given her own intelligence device, Sacred Heart, and gains the power to transform using her adult Sankt Kaiser mode. She soon comes across a girl named Einhart Stratos who, similar to Vivio, is the descendant of another Sankt Kaiser ruler, Claus G.S. Ingvalt. As Einhart becomes determined to prove her fighting style is the strongest, Vivio befriends her and, together with her friends, enters a martial arts tournament where they fight against various magical opponents and learn more about their past lives.

The spin-off series, ViVid Strike!, focuses on an orphaned girl named Fuuka Reventon who was defeated by her former friend, Rinne Berlinetta. Taken in by Einhart, Fuuka begins training to become stronger and win against Rinne, who has become a fierce and merciless fighter.

Media
Manga
The manga, written by Masaki Tsuzuki and illustrated by Takuya Fujima, began serialization in Kadokawa Shoten's Comp Ace on May 26, 2009. and ended on October 26, 2017. It has been compiled into 20 tankōbon volumes. Kadokawa Shoten re-published the first six volumes of the manga in full color under the title Magical Girl Lyrical Nanoha ViVid Full Colors between April 24, 2012, and June 26, 2015. A four-panel comic strip gag manga titled Magical Girl Lyrical Nanoha ViVid Life, written by Masaki Tsuzuki and illustrated by Nekotōfu, began serialization in the May 2011 issue of Kadokawa Shoten's Comptiq magazine and later transferred to Comp Ace in April 2013. It was serialized there until the until the April 2016 issue. In total, four compiled volumes were published.Magical Girl Lyrical Nanoha ViVidMagical Girl Lyrical Nanoha ViVid Full ColorsAnime

On August 15, 2014, an anime adaptation of Magical Girl Lyrical Nanoha ViVid was announced at Comiket 86 and aired from April 3 to June 19, 2015. The anime is produced by A-1 Pictures with direction by Yuuki Itoh, screenplays by Naruo Kobayashi, and character designs by Masaaki Yamano. The opening theme is "Angel Blossom" by Nana Mizuki and the ending theme is "Pleasure treasure" by Yukari Tamura.

A spin-off anime series, titled ViVid Strike!'', aired 12 episodes from October 1 to December 17, 2016, on Tokyo MX and other television networks. The series is directed by Junji Nishimura and produced by Seven Arcs Pictures, with the screenplay written by Masaki Tsuzuki, character designs by Takuya Fujima and Mariko Itō, and music by Yoichiro Yoshikawa. The series is streamed on Amazon Video in the United Kingdom and North America. The opening theme is "Future Strike" by Yui Ogura and the ending theme is "Starry Wish" by Inori Minase.

References

External links
 Anime official website 
 

A-1 Pictures
Tokyo MX original programming
Japanese children's animated action television series
Japanese children's animated adventure television series
Japanese children's animated comic science fiction television series
Japanese children's animated science fantasy television series
Kadokawa Dwango franchises
Magical girl anime and manga
Magical Girl Lyrical Nanoha
Seinen manga
Seven Arcs